Comic Fiesta, abbreviated as CF, is Malaysia's longest-running convention that focuses on animation, comics and games (ACG). Its focus is to celebrate all aspects of art and creativity (and the ever popular ACG culture). Comic Fiesta is usually held in December at various locations, including Kuala Lumpur Convention Centre at KLCC. It is an event held with the motto of "event by fans for fans", and is also currently the first and the biggest non-profit ACG convention in Malaysia, organised by a group of volunteers to bring the comic convention experience to the Malaysian audience.

History 
Comic Fiesta started as a small exhibition at the Selangor Chinese Assembly Hall in Kuala Lumpur in 2002. Comic Fiesta 2003 fared better with the venue being changed to the Impiana Hotel also in Kuala Lumpur (now known as Ancasa Hotel and Spa). With the larger space, the standing capacity was bumped to 300; double the amount of its predecessor. Comic Fiesta 2004 was held at the Malaysian National Visual Art Gallery. The next two years saw Comic Fiesta setting up shop at the prestigious Sekolah Sri Sedaya. Due to its strategic location (close proximity to Sunway Pyramid and easy access by public transportation), many believed that the event had finally found its home. It did not, but it did become the birthplace of Cosplay Chess in 2006 (now a common fixture at many local ACG events). Comic Fiesta was then moved to Berjaya Times Square located in Bukit Bintang.

The seventh iteration of Comic Fiesta was held at the Sunway Convention Centre. Over 3,000 square metres of unobstructed function space certainly played a major role in the record number of attendees for the event. 2008 also saw the debut of the Live Art Demonstrations and the Portfolio Review Pavilion, proving to be big hits with aspiring artists looking to break into the competitive Malaysian comics industry.

The decision to keep and expand the Live Art Demonstrations and Portfolio Review Pavilion certainly played a part in pushing the number of visitors for CF 2009 (also at the Sunway Convention Centre) past the 7,000 mark. Representatives from Imaginary Friends Studios, Pekomik, Big Beak Productions, The One Academy, Limkokwing University of Creative Technology, Clazroom and MDeC participated in the industry seminars. Comic Fiesta 2010, held at Berjaya Times Square's Manhattan Ballroom, continued the trend and attracted over 11,000 people.

In 2011, Comic Fiesta was moved to Kuala Lumpur Convention Centre. Comic Fiesta 2011 attracted 15,293 visitors over 2 days and Comic Fiesta 2012, also held at the Kuala Lumpur Convention Centre drew over 30,000 visitors across two days (22 & 23 December 2012), and was attended by renowned Japanese artists such as Redjuice, Kurata Yoshimi and bless4.

In 2015, Comic Fiesta was moved to Malaysia International Exhibition & Convention Centre located in Mines Wellness City. Comic Fiesta 2015 attracted 45,000 visitors for over 2 days. Performing guests consist of Flow, Majiko from Exit Tunes, Inc., guest cosplayers Reika, Jin (behindinfinity) and also special guests Danny Choo, Hajime Tabata and Wan Hazmer from Square Enix.

In 2016, Comic Fiesta was then moved to Putra World Trade Centre. Although transportation was significantly easier, the venue was also deemed inadequate for the large number of attendees.  Starting from Comic Fiesta 2017, the location reverted to KLCC to accommodate the increasing number of visitors.

Comic Fiesta 2018, which was held at Kuala Lumpur Convention Centre on 22–23 December 2018, attracted approximately 60,000 visitors. Comic Fiesta 2019 was held again on 21–22 December at KLCC.

Comic Fiesta-associated events, such as the Comic Art Festival Kuala Lumpur 7 (CAFKL7), Comic Fiesta Mini Johor 2020, Comic Fiesta Mini Penang 2020 and the Toys Anime Game Comic Con 2020 (TAGCC 2020) was announced to be postponed to 2021, citing the COVID-19 pandemic in Malaysia.

Showcase

Creative Art Market 
Comic Fiesta plays host to the largest amateur creative art market in Malaysia similar to Comiket of Japan, which consists over 100 booths showcasing talents in the field of visual arts and illustration. Comic Fiesta also contains an incredible variety of self-published comics, artbooks, posters and other merchandises available for sale.

Cosplay 
Comic Fiesta hosts both solo and group cosplay competitions and is considered to be the second main focus of the event. Participants use the chance to showcase their skills in cosplay, attracting many to attend the event aside from buying self-published comics and artbooks.

Comic Fiesta Mini 

Comic Fiesta also organises two small CF-like events specialized for ACG enthusiasts in the north and south of Peninsular Malaysia, namely Comic Fiesta Mini Penang (stylized as CF Mini Penang) and Comic Fiesta Mini Johor (stylized as CF Mini JB, since 2018).

List of past Comic Fiesta events

SAYS Youth Society
Sequential Arts Youth Society (SAYS Youth Society) is a volunteer-run, non-profit organisation that aims to educate the public about the ever-expanding ACG community in Malaysia. Established in 2009, its ultimate goal is to create a dynamic avenue where local and international creative talents can come together and push the Malaysian creative industry forward through innovative new ideas.

References

External links 

 Comic Fiesta Official Website
 Comic Fiesta Official Facebook Page
 Comic Fiesta Official Twitter
 Comic Fiesta Instagram

2002 establishments in Malaysia
Anime conventions in Malaysia
Comics conventions
Recurring events established in 2002